Orey Rikshaw is a 1995 Indian Telugu-language drama film written and directed by Dasari Narayana Rao, and produced by Dasari Film University. It stars R. Narayana Murthy, Ravali and Raghunatha Reddy. It features music composed by Vandemataram Srinivas.

The film was released on 9 November 1995 and emerged as a commercial success, eventually attaining a cult following. The film received three Nandi Awards.

Cast 

 R. Narayana Murthy as Suri
 Ravali
 Raghunatha Reddy
 Anuradha
 Poojitha
 Madhurima
 Shivaparvati
 Sri Divya
 Narra Venkateswara Rao
 Sanjeeva
 Mukku Raju
 M. S. Narayana

Production 
Filmmaker Dasari Narayana Rao who facing financial troubles began writing a film for T. Krishna. However, the project was put on hold following Krishna's death from cancer. Dasari's disciple R. Narayana Murthy accepted the offer to play the film's lead and the film began its production.

Soundtrack 
The film has score and soundtrack composed by Vandemataram Srinivas. The soundtrack consists eight songs of which two songs have lyrics written by Dasari Narayana Rao ("Jaagore", "Amma Kanna") while the other six were written by Gaddar who did not take any remuneration. "Nee Padam Meeda Puttu Machanai Chellemma" was particularly successful while "Naa Raktham Tho Naduputhanu Rikshawnu" was not originally composed for the film. The songs were recorded by S. P. Balasubrahmanyam, Srinivas, K. S. Chithra and Manjala Srinivas.

Release and reception 
Orey Rikshaw released on 9 November 1995. It clashed with Chiranjeevi and Kodi Ramakrishna's major production Rikshavodu that released in December 1995. While both Orey Rikshaw and Rikshavodu featured a rickshaw puller as its protagonist, only Orey Rikshaw emerged successful at the box office. Chiranjeevi, who attended 100th day ceremony of the film, commented that Orey Rikshaw won the Rikshaw race between the two films. 

Following the film's success, Dasari went onto to make another revolutionary-themed film Osey Ramulamma (1997) lead by Vijayashanti which also became a success.

Awards 
The film received three Nandi Awards, including Best Male Playback Singer for Vandemataram Srinivas and Best Lyricist for Gaddar (both for the song "Malle Theegaku Pandiri Vole"), in addition to Best Character Actress for Shivaparvati. Srinivas and Gaddar, however, chose to turn down the award.

References

External links 

 

1990s Telugu-language films
1995 drama films
1995 films
Indian drama films
Films directed by Dasari Narayana Rao
Films scored by Vandemataram Srinivas
Films about siblings